Mount Grimminger is a cone-shaped, mostly ice-covered mountain,  high, standing on the north side of Meinardus Glacier, close east of its juncture with Haines Glacier, on the east coast of Palmer Land, Antarctica. It was discovered and photographed from the air in December 1940 by the United States Antarctic Service. During 1947 it was photographed from the air by the Ronne Antarctic Research Expedition under Finn Ronne, who in conjunction with the Falkland Islands Dependencies Survey (FIDS) charted it from the ground. It was named by the FIDS for George Grimminger, an American meteorologist and joint author of the meteorological reports of the Byrd Antarctic Expeditions of 1928–30 and 1933–35, and a member of the latter expedition.

References

External links

Mountains of Palmer Land